The 2018–19 season is the 71st season of competitive association football in Honduras.

National teams

Senior team

CONCACAF Gold Cup

Other matches

Olympic team

Central American and Caribbean Games

U-20 team

CONCACAF U-20 Championship

2018 UNCAF U-19 Tournament

U-17 team

CONCACAF U-17 Championship

2018 UNCAF U-16 Tournament

Domestic clubs

Promotion and relegation

Summer transfers

Winter transfers

Liga Nacional

Liga de Ascenso

Liga Mayor

Honduran Cup

Honduran Supercup

CONCACAF Champions League

CONCACAF League

Other matches

Deaths

References

 
Honduras
Honduras
Football
Football